Tecuilhuitontli  is the name of the Seventh month of the Aztec calendar. It is also a festival in the Aztec religion. The principal deity is Xochipilli and feasts are  also given to Goddess Huixtocihuatl and it is known as the Small Festival of the Lords.

References

Aztec calendars
Aztec mythology and religion